Wouter van Pelt (born 23 April 1968 in Alphen aan den Rijn) is a former Dutch field hockey player, who played 236 international matches for the Netherlands, in which he scored 21 goals. The defender made his debut for the Dutch on 27 March 1989 in a match against England. He played in the Dutch League for HDM and BH  & BC Breda. Van Pelt was a member of the Dutch national team that won the golden medal at the 1996 Summer Olympics in Atlanta, Georgia. Four years later, at the 2000 Summer Olympics in Sydney, the Dutch once again won the title, with Van Pelt on board. He stopped playing hockey at top level in 2005.

External links
 
 Dutch Hockey Federation

1968 births
Living people
Dutch male field hockey players
Male field hockey defenders
Olympic field hockey players of the Netherlands
Field hockey players at the 1992 Summer Olympics
Field hockey players at the 1996 Summer Olympics
1998 Men's Hockey World Cup players
Field hockey players at the 2000 Summer Olympics
Olympic gold medalists for the Netherlands
Sportspeople from Alphen aan den Rijn
Olympic medalists in field hockey
Medalists at the 2000 Summer Olympics
Medalists at the 1996 Summer Olympics
Haagsche Delftsche Mixed players
20th-century Dutch people